Antipterna glacialis is a species of moth in the family Oecophoridae, first described by Edward Meyrick in 1885 as Ocystola glacialis. The holotype was collected at Mount Lofty, South Australia.

Meyrick's description

Further reading

References

Oecophorinae
Taxa described in 1885
Taxa named by Edward Meyrick